Avram Joel Spolsky (born 1965) is a software engineer and writer. He is the author of Joel on Software, a blog on software development, and the creator of the project management software Trello. He was a Program Manager on the Microsoft Excel team between 1991 and 1994. He later founded Fog Creek Software in 2000 and launched the Joel on Software blog. In 2008, he launched the Stack Overflow programmer Q&A site in collaboration with Jeff Atwood. Using the Stack Exchange software product which powers Stack Overflow, the Stack Exchange Network now hosts over 170 Q&A sites.

Biography

Spolsky was born to Jewish parents and grew up in Albuquerque, New Mexico, and lived there until he was 15. He then moved with his family to Israel, where he attended high school and completed his military service in the Paratroopers Brigade. He was one of the founders of the kibbutz Hanaton in Lower Galilee. In 1987, he returned to the United States to attend college. He studied at the University of Pennsylvania for a year before transferring to Yale University, where he was a member of Pierson College and graduated in 1991 with a BS summa cum laude in computer science.

Spolsky started working at Microsoft in 1991 as a program manager on the Microsoft Excel team, where he designed Excel Basic and drove Microsoft's Visual Basic for Applications strategy. He moved to New York City in 1995 where he worked for Viacom and Juno Online Services. In 2000, he founded Fog Creek Software and created the Joel on Software blog. Joel on Software was "one of the first blogs set up by a business owner".

In 2005, Spolsky co-produced and appeared in Aardvark'd: 12 Weeks with Geeks, a documentary documenting Fog Creek's development of Project Aardvark, a remote assistance tool.

In 2008, Spolsky co-founded Stack Overflow, a question and answer community website for software developers, with Jeff Atwood. He served as CEO of the company until Prashanth Chandrasekar succeeded him in the role on October 1, 2019. Spolsky remains the company's Chairman.

In 2011, Spolsky launched Trello, an online project management tool inspired by Kanban methodology.

In 2016, Spolsky announced the appointment of Anil Dash as Fog Creek Software's new CEO, with Spolsky continuing as Stack Overflow's CEO and as a Fog Creek Software board member. The company has since been renamed Glitch.

He is the author of five books, including User Interface Design for Programmers and Smart and Gets Things Done. He is also the creator of "The Joel Test".

Spolsky coined the term fix it twice for a process improvement method. It implies a quick, immediate solution for fixing an incident and a second, slower fix for preventing the same problem from occurring again by targeting the root cause. His use of the term Shlemiel the painter's algorithm, referring to an algorithm that is not scalable due to performing too many redundant actions, was described by salon.com'''s Scott Rosenberg as an example of good writing "about their insular world in a way that wins the respect of their colleagues and the attention of outsiders."

Spolsky made an appearance at the WeAreDevelopers Conference 2017, stating how developers are writing the script for the future. In his speech, Spolsky talks about how software is eating the world, how it is becoming more evident in everyday life as people interact with more software on a day-to-day basis, and how developers are helping to shape how the world will work as technology keeps evolving. He uses the metaphor "we are just little vegetables floating in software soup", referring to our constant use of software for the most mundane activities, including work, social networking, and even taking a cab.

In December 2019, Spolsky revealed he was the chairman of an open-source simulation startup called HASH.

Personal life
In 2015, Spolsky announced his marriage to his husband, Jared, on social media and his blog. He lives on the Upper West Side of Manhattan. In 2022, Joel and Jared adopted a dog named Cooper.

Schlemiel the Painter's algorithm 
In software development, a Shlemiel the painter's algorithm (sometimes, Shlemiel the painter algorithm'', not to be confused with "Painter's algorithm") is a method that is inefficient because the programmer has overlooked some fundamental issues at the very lowest levels of software design. The term was coined in 2001 by Spolsky, who used a Yiddish joke to illustrate a certain poor programming practice: Schlemiel (also rendered Shlemiel) is to paint the dotted lines down the middle of a road. Each day, Schlemiel paints less than he painted the day before, and complains that it is because each day he gets farther away from the paint can, and it takes him longer to go back and put paint on his brush.

The inefficiency to which Spolsky was drawing an analogy was the poor programming practice of repeated concatenation of C-style null-terminated strings. The first step in every implementation of the C standard library function for concatenating strings is determining the length of the first string by checking each character to see whether it is the terminating null character. Next, the second string is copied to the end of the first.

In Spolsky's example, the "Schlemiels" occur when multiple strings are concatenated together:
    strcat( buffer, "John" );    // Here, the string "John" is appended to the buffer
    strcat( buffer, "Paul" );    // Now the string "Paul" is appended to that
    strcat( buffer, "George" );  // ... and "George" is appended to that
    strcat( buffer, "Ringo" );   // ... and "Ringo" is appended to that
After "Paul" has been appended to "John", the length of "JohnPaul" (or, more precisely, the position of the terminating null character) is known within the scope of strcat() but is discarded upon the end of function. Afterwards, when strcat() is told to append "George" to "JohnPaul", strcat() starts at the very first character of "JohnPaul" (which is "J") all over again just to find the terminating null character. Each subsequent call to strcat() has to compute the length again before concatenating another name to the buffer. Analogous to Schlemiel not carrying the paint bucket (or the string's length) with him, all the subsequent strcat()s have to "walk" the length of the string again to determine where the second string should be copied. As more data is added to buffer with each call to strcat(), that terminating null character also gets farther away from the beginning, meaning that subsequent calls are increasingly slow.

The problems illustrated by Spolsky's example are not noticed by a programmer who is using a high-level language and has little or no understanding of how the language implementation works, including some basic knowledge of its underlying principles and functions.

Publications

See also
 List of LGBT people from New York City
 Tech companies in the New York metropolitan area
 Leaky abstraction

References

External links

 Joel on Software

1965 births
American emigrants to Israel
Israeli bloggers
American bloggers
Living people
People from Albuquerque, New Mexico
American computer programmers
American software engineers
American technology writers
American computer businesspeople
Israeli businesspeople
Microsoft employees
University of Pennsylvania alumni
Yale University alumni
Jewish American writers
Jewish bloggers
American LGBT businesspeople
LGBT people from New Mexico
LGBT Jews
21st-century American non-fiction writers
Businesspeople in software
21st-century American Jews